"Human Nature" is a 1991 song performed by English singer and record producer Gary Clail. It is produced by Adrian Sherwood and features Lana Pellay on backing vocals. Released as the first single from his second album, Emotional Hooligan (1991), it peaked at number ten on the UK Singles Chart and number three on the UK Dance Singles Chart. It was also the theme tune to BBC 2's TV-show Snub. A music video was also produced to promote the single.

It was originally intended to use a sample of a speech by Billy Graham on the track, however his representatives refused permission, so the song used portions of the speech re-recorded by Clail. However some promo 12" singles featuring the Billy Graham sample were pressed and distributed.

Critical reception
Pan-European magazine Music & Media deemed it an "outstanding" song from the Emotional Hooligan album. James Hamilton from Music Week called it a "bassily chugging angry roller". James Brown from NME described it as "another electrifying club track that brings the old On-U Sound up to date and bullies the social conscience with its words. Boxheads will recognize its staple technique as being the Snub signature tune, but of course there's more. Comic strip-per Lana Pellay adds a Bacchanalian chorus call, and Sherwood and Oakenfold do the business at the controls. Light, tight, and destined to beat up the charts. The man has presence." Record Mirror picked it as Single of the Week. Jack Barron wrote, "With all the momentum of a nailbomb explosion in the privates, Gary Clail spins once more into orbit riding on the back of a stellar keyboard riff, which you'll instantly recognise as the theme tune to 'Snub TV'". He added, "As a purely physical club experience, 'Human Nature' is like strapping yourself to a roller-coaster that suddenly leaves the rails."

Chart performance
The single peaked at number ten on the UK Singles Chart, number three on the UK Dance Singles Chart, number 27 in Ireland, and at number 69 in the Netherlands. On the Eurochart Hot 100, it reached number 29 in April 1991. Outside Europe, it peaked at number 38 in Australia.

Track listing
 7" single, UK & Europe (1991)
"Human Nature" (On The Mix Edit)
"Human Nature" (Why Is It? Mix)

 12" single, Europe (1991)
"Human Nature" (On The Mix) – 6:18
"Rumours" – 4:40

 CD single, UK & Europe (1991)
"Human Nature" (On The Mix Edit) – 3:40
"Human Nature" (On The Mix) – 6:18
"Rumours" – 4:40

Charts

References

1991 singles
1991 songs
Perfecto Records singles
Electro songs
House music songs